1st FFCC Awards 

Best Film: 
 Fargo 
The 1st Florida Film Critics Circle Awards honoured the best in film for 1996.

Winners
Best Film: 
Fargo
Runner-up: Breaking the Waves
Best Actor: 
Geoffrey Rush - Shine
Runner-up: Tom Cruise - Jerry Maguire
Best Actress: 
Frances McDormand - Fargo
Runner-up: Brenda Blethyn - Secrets & Lies
Best Supporting Actor: 
Edward Norton - The People vs. Larry Flynt, Everyone Says I Love You and Primal Fear
Runner-up: William H. Macy - Fargo
Best Supporting Actress: 
Courtney Love - The People vs. Larry Flynt
Runner-up: Joan Allen - The Crucible
Best Director: 
Joel Coen - Fargo
Best Screenplay: 
Joel and Ethan Coen - Fargo
Best Cinematography: 
John Seale - The English Patient
Best Foreign Language Film: 
Ridicule • France
Best Newcomers: 
Doug Liman (director) and Jon Favreau (actor/writer) - Swingers
Best Song: 
"That Thing You Do" - That Thing You Do!
Golden Orange for Outstanding Contribution to Film:
The 15 African-American men who pooled their resources to finance Get on the Bus.
The Walt Disney Co., for standing up to protests concerning the content of its films by Chinese authorities and the Southern Baptist Convention.

References
Florida Film Critic Group Heaps Awards On `Fargo' Sun Sentinel
TO FLORIDA CRITICS, TOP MOVIE IS 'FARGO' Orlando Sentinel

1990
1996 film awards